Northwest Mississippi Community College is a public community college in Senatobia, Mississippi.  It was founded in 1928. As of August 2008, Northwest's enrollment exceeds 7,100 students. There are approximately 3,000 students on the Senatobia campus—1,100 of which reside in the college's residence halls. Slightly over 3,000 students are enrolled at the DeSoto Center in Southaven, Mississippi, and nearly 1,200 are enrolled at the Lafayette-Yalobusha Center in Oxford, Mississippi.

One of fifteen state community and junior colleges in Mississippi, Northwest is on a  main campus in Senatobia with satellite campuses in Southaven and Oxford. The college is accredited by the Southern Association of Colleges and Schools to award the Associate of Arts and Associate of Applied Science degrees along with professional career certificates. The Northwest campus has 43 buildings, many built or renovated in the last decade. Northwest's district covers Tate, Desoto, Marshall, Benton, Tunica, Panola, Lafayette, Yalobusha, Quitman, and Calhoun Counties in northwest Mississippi.

History
Northwest began as Tate County Agricultural High School in 1915. The College began in 1928 with support from Tate and Quitman Counties and the Mississippi Junior College Commission. The first President was Porter Walker Berry.

The school changed with the times. Depression era students were allowed to pay for room and board with produce, and World War II male students studied at an accelerated pace to join the war effort. The Southern Association of Colleges and Schools gave accreditation to Northwest in 1953. The college serves an eleven county district and gradually expanded its offerings. Today, Internet classes, noncredit classes, and non-traditional offerings for adults round out the modern campus.

Campus

Yalobusha Hall, renovated in 2000, holds several offices, including the Registrar, Admissions, Financial Aid, and Recruiting offices. The James P. McCormick Administration Building, site of the original primary building for the old Tate County Agricultural High School, holds the administrative offices of the president, other officers, and the Business Office. The McCormick Building was named a Mississippi Landmark in 1993.

The DeSoto Center campus is situated on a  site in Southaven, Mississippi. The site was donated by the W. E. Ross family. The post-modern -story steel frame features a glass-and-steel tower that forms the atrium/commons. The building contains 28 classrooms, four computer labs, a practical nursing lab, and two science labs. DeSoto County is also the home of the Olive Branch, Mississippi career-technical campus, established in 1985.

The Lafayette-Yalobusha Technical Center at Oxford, Mississippi, open in 1983, offers a science lab with internet capable lab stations for viewing dissections. The center also uses Dynamic Human software for health education.

Academics
Northwest offers classes to prepare students for further academic achievement or for career advancement.
Northwest has an "open door" policy for admissions. The Registrar's Office requires that potential students complete the following steps:
Have completed and turned in an application.
An official copy of SAT or ACT scores—ACT scores are required for Mississippi students.
An official copy of a transcript from an accredited high school that includes a graduation date; or an official copy of GED scores; or an official copy of college or military transcript(s) from all colleges attended; or if attending another college full-time and attending Northwest part-time, attending an evening class or during a summer semester, a letter of good standing from the full-time college attended.

Degrees offered
 Associate of Arts
 Associate of Applied Science
 Certificate

Student life
There are over 30 student organizations that offer diverse experiences and provide opportunities to compete for awards and scholarships. Leisure activities include pep rallies, cookouts, a workout center, swimming, dancing, and free movies and concerts.

Student publications
The newspaper, the award-winning Ranger Rocket, was the first Mississippi junior college newspaper. Students create the Rocketeer yearbook with guidance from faculty. Students are encouraged to contribute to the student literary publication, the Northwest Review, which is published each spring.

Athletics
Northwest athletic teams are the Rangers. The college offers sports programs in football, soccer, softball, baseball, men's basketball, women's basketball, rodeo, and golf.

Notable alumni

 John Avery, professional football player
 Adrian Banks, American-Israeli basketball player for Hapoel Tel Aviv of the Israeli Basketball Super League
 Jeff Blackshear, professional football player
 Willie Blade, professional football player
 Eddie Blake, professional football player
 Ricky Blake, professional football player
 Eldra Buckley, professional football player
 Leonard Burton, professional football player
 Wesley Carroll, professional football player
 Kory Chapman, professional football player
 Treston Decoud, professional football player
 Dan Footman, professional football player
 John Grisham, author, lawyer and politician
 Damon Harrison, professional football player
 Roy Hart, professional football player
 Donald Hawkins, professional football player
 Bill Houston, professional football player
 Cletidus Hunt, professional football player
 Germany Kent, media personality
 Cortez Kennedy, professional football player
 Will Hall, football coach
 Gardner Minshew, professional football player
 Bryant Mix, professional football player
 Alton Montgomery, professional football player
 Ronnie Musgrove,  politician who served as the 29th Lieutenant Governor of Mississippi 
 Karl Oliver, Mississippi state representative for District 46
 Gerald Perry, professional football player
 Roell Preston, professional football player
 Cody Reed, professional baseball pitcher
 Eric Smith (wide receiver), professional football player
 Daniel Thomas, professional football player
 Fred Thomas, professional football player
 Patrick Trahan, professional football player
 Colston Weatherington, professional football player
 Leonard Wheeler, professional football player
 Gizmo Williams, professional football player
 Elise Varner Winter, First Lady of Mississippi

References

External links
 

Community colleges in Mississippi
Schools in Tate County, Mississippi
Schools in DeSoto County, Mississippi
Schools in Lafayette County, Mississippi
Oxford, Mississippi
Southaven, Mississippi
Educational institutions established in 1928
1928 establishments in Mississippi
NJCAA athletics
Universities and colleges accredited by the Southern Association of Colleges and Schools